Crystal Maria Rogers is an American woman from Bardstown, Kentucky who went missing on July 3, 2015.

Disappearance 
At the time of her disappearance, the 35-year-old mother of five was living with her boyfriend, Brooks Houck, their two-year-old son, and her other children. Houck is the last person known to have seen her, stating “she was on her phone playing games” at their home when he went to bed. She was gone the next morning when he woke up, and her car was not in the driveway.

Her family began to worry after multiple attempts to contact her that day failed. Two days later, on July 5, Crystal’s 2007 Chevrolet was found parked with a flat tire by mile marker 14 of the Bluegrass Parkway. The keys were still in the ignition and her purse and cellphone were also found inside. She was officially reported missing by her mother, Sherry Ballard, the same day.

Investigation and suspects 
The Ballard family was very vocal about their suspicion of Brooks Houck having some sort of involvement in Rogers's disappearance early on in the case. In an interview, Crystal’s sister said, “[Brooks] has not offered once to search, or help, or do anything for the family.” On July 8, Houck was brought in by the Nelson County Sheriff’s Office for questioning. Nick Houck, Brooks' brother and a Bardstown Police officer, called mid-interview and told him not to speak with police. The next day, Nick was called to testify in front of a grand jury, which led police to suspect he also had involvement in the disappearance. It is at this time that Nick stopped cooperating with the Sheriff’s Office; however, he agreed to a polygraph test after being interviewed by Kentucky State Police. Nick finally took a polygraph test on July 20, after being contacted by the FBI. The examiner expressed “grave concerns” about the results with Bardstown Police Chief McCubbin. On October 16, 2015, Nick was fired from the Bardstown Police Department and Brooks was officially named a suspect in the case.

A white Buick became an important piece of evidence when a private investigator found that one was parked at the Houck farm the night Rogers disappeared. The Houck brothers' grandmother, Anna Whitesides, owned a white Buick but sold it several weeks after Rogers went missing. Authorities issued a subpoena for the 82-year-old to testify in front of a grand jury. The subpoena stated the car may have been used to dispose of a body, cleaned, and sold in an attempt to prevent evidence from being discovered. Whitesides refused to testify in front of a grand jury. Attorney Jason Floyd said her statement to police and the car buyer’s information was enough. A judge later ruled to keep all future proceedings involving Whitesides confidential. In August of 2016, police searched the residences of Whitesides and Nick Houck for DNA.

Despite multiple search efforts and a $100,000 reward being offered for any information, Rogers remains missing. Ramon Pineiroa, the new Nelson County Sheriff appointed in 2019, has stated his commitment to solving the case. In an interview, Pineiroa said the agency has a good idea of what happened to Rogers, and his mission is to find enough facts and evidence to make an arrest.

Murder of Tommy Ballard 
On the morning of November 19th, 2016, sixteen months after Rogers's disappearance, her 54-year-old father, Tommy Ballard, was shot to death. He had been hunting on his private property with his 12-year-old grandson, Rogers' eldest son. He had been shot once, in the chest. Police have cleared the grandson of foul play, and have also ruled out suicide as Tommy’s gun was never fired.

FBI in Bardstown 
The FBI has conducted two searches in Bardstown; the first search occurred during August of 2020 and the second was in August of 2021. The second search took place in the Woodlawn Springs subdivision, where Brooks Houck's construction company built several houses shortly after the disappearance of Crystal Rogers. The FBI has not disclosed any details of their findings at this location, but on August 27, 2021, they did announce that an "item of interest" had been recovered from the concrete at one of the homes. During this most recent search, the FBI also stated that they know there are people in Bardstown who have information on this case, and added that it was time for those people to come forward.

See also
List of people who disappeared

References 

2010s missing person cases
2015 in Kentucky
History of women in Kentucky
July 2015 events in the United States
Missing person cases in Kentucky
Rogers, Crystal